Trichonitocris tibialis is a species of beetle in the family Cerambycidae, and the only species in the genus Trichonitocris. It was described by Stephan von Breuning in 1961.

References

Saperdini
Beetles described in 1961